David Trejo (born 29 December 1945) is a Mexican rower. He competed in the men's coxless four event at the 1968 Summer Olympics.

References

External links
 

1945 births
Living people
Mexican male rowers
Olympic rowers of Mexico
Rowers at the 1968 Summer Olympics
Rowers from Mexico City
Pan American Games medalists in rowing
Pan American Games bronze medalists for Mexico
Rowers at the 1967 Pan American Games
20th-century Mexican people
21st-century Mexican people